Navanax aenigmaticus common name the mysterious aglaja is a species of Navanax found in the Pacific Coast of Central America.

References 

 Turgeon, D., Quinn, J. F., Bogan, A. E., Coan, E. V., Hochberg, F. G., Lyons, W. G., Mikkelsen, P. M., Neves, R. J., Roper, C. F. E., Rosenberg, G., Roth, B., Scheltema, A., Thompson, F. G., Vecchione, M., Williams, J. D. (1998). Common and scientific names of aquatic invertebrates from the United States and Canada: mollusks. 2nd ed. American Fisheries Society Special Publication, 26. American Fisheries Society: Bethesda, MD (USA). ISBN 1-888569-01-8. IX, 526 + cd-rom pp

External links
 Ortea, J.; Caballer, M.; Moro L.; Espinosa, J. (2012). Notas en Opistobranchia (Mollusca, Gastropoda) I. Sobre la validez de la especie Posterobranchus orbignyanus Rochebrune, 1881 (Cephalaspidea, Aglajidae). Revista de la Academia Canaria de Ciencias. 23(3): 39-44
 Zamora-Silva A. & Malaquias M.A.E. (2018 [nomenclatural availability: 2017). Molecular phylogeny of the Aglajidae head-shield sea slugs (Heterobranchia: Cephalaspidea): new evolutionary lineages revealed and proposal of a new classification. Zoological Journal of the Linnean Society. 183(1): 1-51]

Aglajidae
Western North American coastal fauna
Gastropods described in 1893